Painko is an islet in Penrhyn Atoll (Tongareva) in the Cook Islands. It is on the northern edge of the atoll, between Tokearu and Ruahara.

References

Penrhyn atoll